Moderate Islam and moderate Muslim are labels that are used within counterterrorism discourse as the complement of "Islamic extremism" and imply that supporting Islamic terrorism is the characteristic of a "radical" faction within Islam, and a "moderate" faction of Muslims denounces extremist violence such as Islamic terrorism, militant jihadism and radical Islamism.

Moderation in Islam and moderate Islam are also terms that occur as interpretation of the Islamic concepts of wasatiyyah or wasat (the middle way, centre, balanced, best) as well as Iqtisad (اقتصاد) (right way, middle way, honest, truthful way) and Qasd (قصد). Those terms are used in the Quran, such as to describe the Muslim community:

Moderate views, in the first sense, are widespread according to opinion polls. A majority in eleven Sunni Muslim countries is very negative towards the Islamic State. Moderate perceptions are especially common among Muslims in the Western world, such as Euroislam. Of US Muslims, 82 percent (2017) are concerned about Muslim global extremism, 81 percent believe that suicide bombing can never be justified, and 48 percent believe Muslim leaders have not done enough to prevent extremism (2011).

Criticism

Several Muslim scholars and leaders have made objections to the term "moderate Islam", and argued harm is caused by its usage.

The term implies a distinction between being "fully" Muslim and being moderate Muslim, and suggests that Muslims practicing complete/full Islam are dangerous, and that terrorism and extremism are the norm in the Islamic tradition. The writer Shireen Younus explains, "The qualifier of “moderate” suggests that there is something innately violent about Islam. It leads to the false conclusion that a small group of “moderates” is standing in opposition to a large swath of violent, ISIS-supporting radicals. This is simply not true because the reality is the complete opposite. When the media talks about “moderate Muslims”, they are perpetuating a dangerous narrative of Islam as a violent religion that is at odds with American society."

The Doctor of Law Lorenzo G. Vidino describes the term as "inherently controversial, vague and subjective" and Muslim scholars such as Dr Debbie Almontaser have argued that Muslim populations predictably find the "moderate Muslim" label offensive.

Adrian Cherney and Kristina Murphy argue that the categorisations of moderate/extremist are not neutral, and that their widespread deployment "deprives Muslims of the agency to define the parameters of the debate around counterterrorism and also the terms of reference through which they are labelled as either for or against terrorism." Although some Muslims do employ the use of such language, it is seen by others as further stigmatising Muslim communities and Islam.

The Pakistani born journalist Sarfraz Manzoor also argues that the "moderate Muslim" label is offensive, as he believes that it implies ordinary Islam is not inherently peaceful. Others believe that it implies that "moderate Muslims" are not "fully Muslim", or that the term equivalates "progressive" or "secular" with "moderate". Others, such as Turkish President Recep Tayyip Erdoğan (in response to the Saudi Crown Prince's ‘moderate Islam’ pledge) reject the term as a Western notion stating that there is only one Islam.

The general criticism of this term is that it implies that the "Islam" and "Muslim" refer to something inherently violent, giving the impression that they need an adjective ("moderate") to assure otherwise.

French researcher of religious extremism Olivier Roy also points out the difficulties of focusing on "moderate" Islam or Islamic reformation as a means of fighting terrorism. In an interview in with Qantara he stated:
Radicals are not "mainstream" Muslims who went astray after studying the Koran and Islamic theology. You donʹt become a terrorist because you listen to a Salafist preacher ... (radicalisation occurs less in mosques than in jail). They donʹt choose radicalism (either religious or political) because of their theological studies: they want radicalism. Even if other people succeed in reforming Islam, it wonʹt change the mind of the radicals.
<P>... no revealed religion is moderate: all religions state that, as Pope Benedict said, there is a non-negotiable truth. And the idea that any reform is "liberal" is nonsense: Luther and Calvin were not liberal (indeed, the former showed anti-Semitic tendencies). Of course Protestantism provided the theological basis for political reform, but also for racism (apartheid is strongly entrenched in Calvinist theology). 
<P>Secularists tend to consider that a moderate believer is somebody who believes moderately: but that is not the definition of moderation for believers; moderation for them is not about beliefs, but about accepting life in a secular society, even if they stick to conservative values. That is exactly what Muslims are learning to do.

Related branches of Islam
Liberalism and progressivism within Islam is sometimes seen as a subset of moderate orientations of Islam, while other moderate views may be conservative.

Moderate islamism
Moderate islam should not be confused with moderate islamism. Before the 2008 Egypt election, the fundamentalist Muslim Brotherhood was described as moderate Islamists in comparisons to the more radical Islamists in the country's Salafist party, although the movement has always taken a stand against secularism, it has been banned in the country and later has been classified as a terrorist organization by several countries.

The Ennahdha Party of Tunisia has been described as a moderate Islamist party since the 1980s, when it advocated a "Tunisian" form of Islamism recognizing democracy, political pluralism and a "dialogue" with the West. In 2011, a spokesman for the party described it as moderate Islamic rather than Islamistic, since it does not want a theocracy.

See also
Cultural muslim
Moderate
Wasatiyyah (Islamic term)
Enlightened moderation
Euroislam
Islam and modernity
Islamic modernism
Liberalism and progressivism within Islam
Liberal Catholicism
Moderate, a middle position in a left/right political scale
Moderation, the process of eliminating or lessening extremes.
Pacifism in Islam
Peace in Islamic philosophy

References

External links

The Plight of the Hypocrites
The Mix of Disbelieving People

War on terror
Islam and politics
Islamic terrorism